The fifth season of the Canadian television comedy series Video on Trial premiered on MuchMusic on September 28, 2009 and concluded on September 6, 2010. It consists of 31 episodes.

Background
Video on Trial features music videos being humorously critiqued in a manner akin to a courtroom trial. The show's tongue-in-cheek manifesto, as announced in its original opening sequence, is seeing to it that "all music videos are brought to justice". A typical half-hour episode features five music videos being "tried" by a panel of five personalities acting as jurors.

Production
The first 21 episodes of the season follow the same basic format adhered to in the show's first four seasons, with each episode commencing with a roll call of the jury and a reading of the docket of accused music videos, and the remainder of the episode being dedicated to the trials for each video. The specific charges leveled at a video are announced at the beginning of its trial, and a final verdict for the artist of the video is presented at the conclusion of the trial.

Beginning with episode 22, a new graphical scheme was introduced and the standard Video on Trial episode format was significantly revamped, with the opening roll call of jurors and the readings of charges and final verdicts for each video being eliminated.

Episodes

References

2009 Canadian television seasons
2010 Canadian television seasons